VELUX is a Danish manufacturing company that specialises in roof windows, skylights, suntunnels and related accessories. The company is headquartered in Hørsholm, Denmark and is a part of VKR Holding A/S. VELUX Group is a founding partner of the global Active House Alliance.

The name VELUX originates from the Latin word ventus meaning wind and lux meaning light.

History

VELUX was founded in 1941 by Villum Kann Rasmussen. Kann Rasmussen patented his first window in 1942, which was designed to make use of natural light and let in air to ventilate previously dark and stuffy lofts.

In 1952, the company started its international expansion, offering its products in Sweden and Germany. By 1965, VELUX Group had expanded into 12 markets and, by the early 1970s, had grown from around 300 to more than 1,000 employees.

In 1975, VELUX Group expanded to the US and a factory was built there in 1978.
In the early 1980s, VELUX expanded to Central and Eastern Europe and by the end of the decade, the company had moved into markets in South America, Asia, and Australia. In 1992, Rasmussen's eldest son, Lars Kann-Rasmussen, born in 1964, took over from Villum, who chaired the management of V. Kann Rasmussen Industrie — the parent company of the Velux Group. Villum died in 1993 at the age of 84 years. In the next decades, Lars modernized and built the VELUX group into an international company. At the beginning of the 21st century, the VELUX Group employed more than 10,000 employees at production sites in 11 countries.

Organisation

VELUX has 27 production sites in 11 countries and sales companies in 36 countries.

The VELUX Group employs 12,500 employees worldwide. The VELUX Group is owned by VKR Holding A/S, a limited company wholly owned by non-profit, charitable foundations (THE VELUX FOUNDATIONS) and family. In 2021, VKR Holding had total revenue of EUR 3.5 billion and THE VELUX FOUNDATIONS donated EUR 244 million in charitable grants.

Products
In addition to roof windows for flat roofs and pitched roofs, VELUX offers many other types of products like: blinds, roller shutters, and smart home products for easier operation.

Sustainability
In 1965, VELUX founder Villum Kann Rasmussen formulated the Model Company Objective, upon which the company's values, principles and ways of operating are based.  
The company's Sustainability Strategy 2030, launched in 2020 is a 10-year strategy called ‘It’s our nature’. The strategy is split into three areas: ‘pioneer climate and nature action’, ‘innovate sustainable products’, and ‘secure a responsible business´.

VELUX Group entered a partnership with the Worldwide Fund for Nature (WWF) in 2020 and pledged to capture the company's historical CO2 emissions through forest conservation projects. This means taking responsibility for both past and future carbon emissions. The company aims to become Lifetime Carbon Neutral by 2041.

Sponsorships

The company has previously sponsored Velux 5 Oceans Race and the EHF Champions League.

References

External links
 
 Video of production, by Discovery Channel

Building materials companies of Denmark
Danish companies established in 1941
Companies based in Hørsholm Municipality
Glassmaking companies of Denmark
Danish brands